The 1908 United States House of Representatives elections in South Carolina were held on November 3, 1908, to select seven Representatives for two-year terms from the state of South Carolina.  All seven incumbents were re-elected and the composition of the state delegation remained solely Democratic.

1st congressional district
Incumbent Democratic Congressman George Swinton Legaré of the 1st congressional district, in office since 1903, defeated Republican challenger Aaron P. Prioleau.

General election results

|-
| 
| colspan=5 |Democratic hold
|-

2nd congressional district
Incumbent Democratic Congressman James O'H. Patterson of the 2nd congressional district, in office since 1905, defeated W.S. Smith in the Democratic primary and Republican Isaac C. Myers in the general election.

Democratic primary

General election results

|-
| 
| colspan=5 |Democratic hold
|-

3rd congressional district
Incumbent Democratic Congressman Wyatt Aiken of the 3rd congressional district, in office since 1903, defeated Julius E. Boggs in the Democratic primary and was unopposed in the general election.

Democratic primary

General election results

|-
| 
| colspan=5 |Democratic hold
|-

4th congressional district
Incumbent Democratic Congressman Joseph T. Johnson of the 4th congressional district, in office since 1901, was unopposed in his bid for re-election.

General election results

|-
| 
| colspan=5 |Democratic hold
|-

5th congressional district
Incumbent Democratic Congressman David E. Finley of the 5th congressional district, in office since 1899, won the Democratic primary and was unopposed in the general election.

Democratic primary

General election results

|-
| 
| colspan=5 |Democratic hold
|-

6th congressional district
Incumbent Democratic Congressman J. Edwin Ellerbe of the 6th congressional district, in office since 1901, won the Democratic primary and was unopposed in the general election.

Democratic primary

General election results

|-
| 
| colspan=5 |Democratic hold
|-

7th congressional district
Incumbent Democratic Congressman Asbury Francis Lever of the 7th congressional district, in office since 1901, defeated Republican challenger R.H. Richardson.

General election results

|-
| 
| colspan=5 |Democratic hold
|-

See also
United States House of Representatives elections, 1908
South Carolina gubernatorial election, 1908
South Carolina's congressional districts

References

"Report of the Secretary of State to the General Assembly of South Carolina.  Part II." Reports and Resolutions of the General Assembly of the State of South Carolina. Volume III. Columbia, SC: 1909, pp. 154–155.

South Carolina
1908
United States House of Representatives